Amber Robles-Gordon (born 1977 San Juan, Puerto Rico) is an American mixed media visual artist.   She resides in Washington, DC and predominantly works with found objects and textiles to create assemblages, large-scale sculptures, installations and public artwork.

Education 
She received a BS in 2005 from Trinity College, in Washington, DC and subsequently an MFA (Painting) in 2011 from Howard University, also in Washington, DC. Robles-Gordon has been a key member of the Black Artists DC, (BADC) serving as exhibitions coordinator, Vice President and President. Robles-Gordon is also the co-founder of Delusions of Grandeur Artist Collective.

Artwork 
Robles-Gordon has exhibited widely in the US, Europe, and Asia. In 2010 she was granted an apprenticeship with the DC Commission on the Arts and Humanities to create a public art installation as part of the D.C. Creates Public Arts Program. She was subsequently was also commissioned to create temporary and permanent public art installations for the Washington Projects for the Arts, the Northern Virginia Fine Arts Association (NVFAA), the Humanities Council of Washington, D.C., Howard University, and the Schomburg Center for Research in Black Culture.

Reviews
In a 2018 review of her two-person show at the Morton Fine Art Gallery in Washington, DC, The Washington Post noted that "Robles-Gordon, a D.C. native, is known for hanging strands of textiles and other found objects in intricate arrangements... Whether seen as cosmic or botanical, the artist’s circling compositions exalt natural cycles." A few years earlier, The Washington Post had observed that "Working entirely with found objects, the Caribbean-rooted local artist arrays ribbons and scraps on (mostly) wire frameworks. The result is a riot of colors and patterns, evoking the tropics while playing on the contrast between the rigid frames and malleable fabric."

Solo Shows 
1995 The Art, The Brittany, Arlington, VA
1997 The Artwork of A. Robles-Gordon, Dance Place Exhibition Space, Washington, DC
2007 Can You Free Me?, Ramee’ Gallery, Washington, DC
2010 Matrices of Transformation, Michael Platt Studio Gallery, Washington, DC
2011 Milked, National League of American Penn Woman, Washington, DC
2011 Wired, Installation and Exhibit, Pleasant Plains Workshop, Washington, DC
2012 Milked, Riverviews Art Space, Lynchburg, Virginia
2012 With Every Fiber of My Being, Honfleur Gallery, Washington, DC
2017 Arts Center/Gallery Delaware State University, Dover, DE
2017 Pennsylvania College of Art and Design, Lancaster, PA
2018  Kohl Gallery at Washington College, Chestertown, MD
2018 Third Eye Open, Morton Fine Art, Washington, DC
2020 American University (upcoming), American University Museum at Katzen Arts Center, Washington, DC

Museum and University Group Shows 
2006 Mother and Child: Expression of Love, Smithsonian Anacostia Museum and Center for African American History, Washington, DC
2006 Sistahs, In Our Own Words, Banneker Douglass Museum, Annapolis, MD
2007 A Creative Profile: Artist of the East Bank, Smithsonian Anacostia Museum and Center for African American History, Washington, DC
2009 Colorblind/Colorsight, The Rotunda Gallery at American University, Washington, DC
2009 Migrations: BADC Exhibit, Luther Collage, Decorah, Iowa
2010 Global Art Buzz, University of California, Washington Center, Washington, DC
2011 Transformer Silent Auction Exhibition, Corcoran Gallery of Art, Washington, DC
2015 Personal Patterns, Montgomery College, Takoma Park, MD
2016 Arts for Justice, American University Museum, Katzen Center, Washington, DC
2017 Living on the Land, Salisbury University Art Gallery, Salisbury, MD
2019 The Path of Terminator Crossing and Juxtaposing Whiteness, American Academy, Rome, Italy
2021 Successions: Traversing US Colonialism, American University Museum, Washington, DC.

Collections 
Judith A. Hoffberg Archive Library, University of California, Santa Barbara, CA
Masterpiece Miniature Art, Kuala Lumpur, Malaysia
Capital One Bank, McLean, Virginia
City of Washington, DC  
Schomburg Center for Research in Black Culture, New York, NY
The Gautier Family Collection, Washington, DC

References 

African-American contemporary artists
American contemporary artists
Living people
20th-century American women artists
21st-century American women artists
Artists from Washington, D.C.
African-American sculptors
People from Washington, D.C.
People from San Juan, Puerto Rico
1977 births
Puerto Rican artists
Mixed-media artists
Textile artists
20th-century African-American women
20th-century African-American artists
21st-century African-American women
21st-century African-American artists